Ricky Sharpe may refer to:

 Ricky Sharpe (Home and Away), a character from the soap opera Home and Away
 Ricky Sharpe (American football) (born 1980), Arena Football League player